Bolívar is a municipality (municipio) in La Unión Department of El Salvador.

Municipalities of the La Unión Department